Family Game Fight! is an American game show, where families take on each other in massive games, with a chance to win $100,000. The show is hosted by Kristen Bell and Dax Shepard, marking their first television project together. The series premiered on NBC at a special time on August 8, 2021 at 10.30 p.m., while the actual series began airing on August 11 at 9 p.m.

The show is partially based on The Ellen DeGeneres Show and Ellen's Game of Games and is executive produced by Ellen DeGeneres with her group (including Bell and Shepard).

Format
In each episode, two families of a maximum four members are joined by Kristen and Dax to take on in a different set of 'larger-than-life'- style games, physical and mental. Both families compete in a series of games, with the winning family earning a shot on winning $100,000.

The families competing can be any kind of between Brothers and Sisters, Moms and Best Mates, and as well regular families including Parents, Grandparents and Kids.

Preliminary Games

 Air Heads: Four team members are given a secret word by the opposing team, and each one submits a clue to their fifth teammate, the guesser. If two players give the same clue, they are blasted with air to the face (hence the name "Air Heads"), and their mutual clue is discarded. The guesser must identify the secret word based on the remaining clues. The team that correctly guesses the most words wins.
 Between the Sheets: In this game, hosts Shepard and Bell are in a bed, where they wear blindfolds and guess the objects hidden under the sheets while describing them to each other. Meanwhile, the Families have to place a bet on how many items their host would get right. The Family with most correct guesses wins the game.
 Brain Freeze: In this game, one team member is placed in a freezer and wears headphones so they can't hear anything. The rest of their family, along with either Kristen or Dax, have to list things relating to a given category. The member in the freezer then has to guess the answers given by their team. A wrong answer leads to a river of ice flowing onto the members' backs. Three wrong answers ends the team's turn. The team with the most correct guesses wins.
 Deep Dish Dash: 
 Fruit Flies:
 Helium Hoops: Two team members have to carry a helium balloon, wedged between them, through an obstacle course without using their hands. At the same time, the opposing team throws balls at them. At the end of the course they have to release their balloon so it goes through a hoop suspended above them. Ater the other team has a turn putting balloons through the hoop, the team who put the most balloons through the hoop wins.
 Nosy Neighbors: In this game, one player from each team will jump on a trampoline and give clues to Shepard and Bell about a collage of celebrities on the other side of the fence.
 Pie Rollers: In this game, hosts Shepard and Bell play alongside one player from each of their team, where they have to challenge the opposing team to guess a word using only a fixed number of describing words. For each wrong answer, the team member guessing will get pie on the face.
 Sound Bites: One team member plays with either Kristen or Dax. The players alternate grabbing an item and making a sound effect clue and guessing the clue. The team with the most correct answers wins. 
 Taste Buds: This game is based on Ellen DeGeneres' creations, where contestants have to guess a food or item and explain it to the other members with blindfolds on. This version just with Families in addition; the Family with the most correct answers wins the game.

Final Game: Spin Cycle
The winning family is sit on the rotating podium and had 60 seconds to name as many as 10 objects as described by Shepard and Bell in alternation, either by using words, acting or drawing them. Each correct answer awarded $10,000 but the rotating podium increases its speed. The game ends once the family identifies all 10 objects or ran out of time.

Production
In February 2019, when Kristen and Dax visited on The Ellen DeGeneres Show, they were forced to play one on Ellen's favorite game, called "Taste Buds". According to Ellen, "It was so much better than it could've been ever hoped". Afterwards, Ellen (with her production group) came up with an idea of whole new game show, starring Kristen and Dax. Later, it was revealed as Family Game Fight, with DeGeneres as leading executive producer.

The show was originally scheduled to premiere on August 11, 2021. On July 11, NBC announced that a preview of the series would air following its primetime broadcast of the 2020 Summer Olympics closing ceremony, replacing Ultimate Slip 'N Slide (whose production had been suspended).

In May 2022, NBC shelved the series indefinitely.

Episodes

Reception

U.S. ratings

Critical reception
Joel Keller of Decider wrote "What makes Family Game Fight fun isn't the families competing, and it's mostly not the game play, though the games the families play are goofy and fun to watch. No, what makes FGF an enjoyable show is its hosts".

References

NBC original programming
2021 American television series debuts
2020s American game shows
The Ellen DeGeneres Show
American television spin-offs
English-language television shows
Television series by A Very Good Production
Television series by Telepictures
Television series by Warner Horizon Television
Television series created by Ellen DeGeneres